Gregory William Slaughter (born May 19, 1988) is a Filipino-American professional basketball player for the Rizing Zephyr Fukuoka of the B2 League. He was selected first overall by the Barangay Ginebra in the 2013 PBA draft. Sports commentators and scribes call him GregZilla because of his apparent heft and height.

Early life
He was born in Ohio and grew up in Virginia, finishing at Massaponax High School. In 2007, his family moved to Cebu, the hometown of his mother. He quickly learned Cebuano and was convinced by his maternal uncles to play competitive basketball.

College career
He studied and played for the University of the Visayas from 2007 to 2009 and took up Political Science, winning the Cebu Schools Athletic Foundation, Inc. (CESAFI) men's basketball title each year in his three-year stint with UV, as well as the league MVP award in 2008 and 2009, the latter of which he shared with June Mar Fajardo of the University of Cebu. He transferred to Ateneo de Manila University in 2010 and became an eligible player in 2011. In his two seasons for the Blue Eagles, he averaged 13.1 PPG, 9.8 RPG, 1.8 APG 2.9 BPG and 49.7 FG%, and he placed second in rebounds and blocks. He successfully teamed up with Kiefer Ravena and Nico Salva to lead Ateneo to two UAAP championships and completing a five-peat.

PBA D-League
After graduating from Ateneo, he signed with PBA D-League team NLEX Road Warriors to showcase his talent for the upcoming PBA Draft.

Career

PBA draft
Slaughter declared for the 2013 PBA draft. In the prospect camp, he was measured to have height of 6 foot and 11 5/8 inches and a wingspan of 85 inches. He had a vertical reach of 11 feet 6 inches and performed 40 bench presses, the most of all draft applicants. He also did 50 situps, 62 pushups and 18 pullups. After the workout, multiple PBA managers and analysts listed him as the no. 1 prospect. Barangay Ginebra San Miguel picked him with the #1 pick in the draft.

Barangay Ginebra San Miguel (2013–2020)
Greg Slaughter was paired with Japeth Aguilar to form one of the most formidable frontcourt duos in the PBA and was dubbed the "Twin Towers". In his first game in the PBA, he tallied 10 points (5 of 9 shooting) and 13 rebounds in 36 minutes of play. On February 8, 2020 via Instagram, Slaughter announced that he's taking a break from PBA after his contract with Ginebra already expired.

On February 4, 2021, Ginebra coach Tim Cone confirmed that Slaughter is re-signed with the team after a 1-year hiatus.

NorthPort Batang Pier (2021) 
On March 5, 2021, Slaughter was traded to the NorthPort Batang Pier in exchange for Christian Standhardinger. He became a restricted free agent on January 31, 2022. He was unable to re-sign with NorthPort due to contract disputes.

Rizing Zephyr Fukuoka (2022–present)
On July 9, 2022, Slaughter signed with Rizing Zephyr Fukuoka of the B2 League of Japan marking his departure from the PBA.

PBA career statistics

As of the end of 2021 Season

Season-by-season averages

|-
| align=left | 
| align="left" | Barangay Ginebra
| 43 || 32.9 || .532 || .000 || .641 || 10.0 || 1.5 || .2 || 1.4 || 14.6
|-
| align=left | 
| align="left" | Barangay Ginebra
| 32 || 28.8 || .494 || - || .705 || 10.3 || 1.3 || .2 || .8 || 14.8
|-
| align=left | 
| align="left" | Barangay Ginebra
| 26 || 35.3 || .545 || .000 || .708 || 11.7 || 2.0 || .4 || 1.3 || 19.7
|-
| align=left | 
| align="left" | Barangay Ginebra
| 23 || 27.4 || .487 || -|| .659 || 8.2 || 1.4 || .2 || 1.9 || 13.8
|-
| align=left | 
| align="left" | Barangay Ginebra
| 38 || 27.7 || .486 || .000 || .691 || 8.0 || 1.9 || .3 || 1.1 || 13.4
|-
| align=left | 
| align="left" | Barangay Ginebra
| 49 || 22.8 || .508 || - || .713 || 6.4 || 1.0 || .3 || .9 || 9.8
|-
| align="left" | 
| align="left" | NorthPort
| 12 || 35.3 || .480 || .059 || .563 || 10.8 || .7 || .3 || 1.9 || 16.5
|-class=sortbottom
| align=center colspan=2 | Career
| 223 || 29.0 || .508 || .048 || .678 || 9.0 || 1.4 || .3 || 1.2 || 14.0

International career
Slaughter was the starting center for the Sinag Pilipinas team that won the 2011 SEA Games and the 2011 SEABA tournament which was the qualifying tournament for the 2011 FIBA Asia Championship. He was also a part of the national team pool in preparation for the 2013 FIBA Asia Championship held in the Philippines but did not make it to the final 12 roster. He was again invited to the pool that will train to compete in both the 2014 FIBA Basketball World Cup in Spain and the 2014 Asian Games in Incheon, South Korea, but he declined.

References

1988 births
Living people
American men's basketball players
American sportspeople of Filipino descent
Asian Games competitors for the Philippines
Ateneo Blue Eagles men's basketball players
Barangay Ginebra San Miguel draft picks
Barangay Ginebra San Miguel players
Basketball players at the 2010 Asian Games
Basketball players from Cleveland
Centers (basketball)
Citizens of the Philippines through descent
Competitors at the 2011 Southeast Asian Games
Competitors at the 2019 Southeast Asian Games
Filipino expatriate basketball people in Japan
Filipino men's basketball players
NorthPort Batang Pier players
Philippine Basketball Association All-Stars
Philippines men's national basketball team players
Rizing Zephyr Fukuoka players
Southeast Asian Games gold medalists for the Philippines
Southeast Asian Games medalists in basketball
UV Green Lancers basketball players